Thomas Polton (died 1433) was a medieval Bishop of Hereford, Bishop of Chichester, and Bishop of Worcester.

Polton was nominated to the see of Hereford on 15 July 1420, and consecrated as bishop on 21 July 1420.

Polton was transferred to the see of Chichester on 17 November 1421, but was translated to the see of Worcester on 27 February 1426.

Polton died on 23 August 1433 as bishop of Worcester.

Citations

References

 

1433 deaths
Bishops of Chichester
Bishops of Worcester
Bishops of Hereford
Deans of York
15th-century English Roman Catholic bishops
Year of birth unknown